Egem can refer to:

 Egem (East Flanders), a hamlet in the sub-municipality of Bambrugge in the municipality of Erpe-Mere
 Egem (West Flanders), a sub-municipality of Pittem